Relbia is a semi-rural locality and town in the local government areas of Launceston and Northern Midlands, in the Northern and Central regions of Tasmania. The 2016 census determined a population of 678 for the state suburb of Relbia.

History
The name Relbia comes from a property settled in the area prior to 1850. It is an Aboriginal word meaning “long way, long time”. It was gazetted as a locality in 1959.

Geography
The North Esk River forms the north-eastern boundary. The Western Rail Line runs along the south-western boundary, through the west of the locality and the town, and then along the north-western boundary.

Road infrastructure
Route C411 route (Relbia Road) starts at the southern boundary and runs through to the north-west.

References

Launceston, Tasmania
Localities of Northern Midlands Council
Localities of City of Launceston
Towns in Tasmania